Tommy Tilston (19 February 1926 – April 1997) was an English footballer, who played as an inside forward in the Football League for Chester, Tranmere Rovers, Wrexham, Crystal Palace and Chelmsford City.

References

1926 births
Chester City F.C. players
Tranmere Rovers F.C. players
Wrexham A.F.C. players
Crystal Palace F.C. players
Chelmsford City F.C. players
1997 deaths
People from Chester
English footballers
Association football inside forwards